Umotína or Umutína is a recently extinct language of Brazil.

Phonology
It is one of the few languages in the world to have a linguolabial consonant; in unpublished data, Floyd Lounsbury reported it has the voiceless linguolabial plosive: //.

References

Bororoan languages
Indigenous languages of South America
Languages of Brazil
Mato Grosso
Extinct languages of South America